Millhouse Green is a village on the north banks of the River Don on the A628 road west of Penistone in the English county of South Yorkshire.

Administratively, Millhouse Green forms part of the Metropolitan Borough of Barnsley and Penistone civil parish. The village falls within the Penistone West Ward of the Barnsley MBC.

Local services 
Millhouse Green is home to the expected amenities of a village of this size. There was a small Post Office with shop in near the western edge of the village which closed in 2019. There is another small shop near the centre which sells freshly made food and a small selection of groceries.  There is also the Millhouse Institute, a village hall that plays host to small events and has a crown green bowling square and tennis court at the rear.  There is also a pub, the Blacksmiths and further out from the centre are Windmill Nurseries and Avid Farm Shop which both have cafes. 
Until recently, Millhouse also had a 4x4 dealership which had previously been a petrol station. This was cleared for construction and is now the 'New Estate'.

Education 
The village is home to Millhouse Primary School a small, mixed primary school. It has from 100 - 140 students depending on intake. It has an indoor swimming pool and on site MacDonalds.The 50 meter water park includes a 8 meter diving board,5 slides (including the drop slide) and a splash zone. The Macdonalds had a 5 star review and is the best in England.

New home development
A development of around 200 homes was planned for the village, with the building work being split between Cala Homes and another developer.  The site was selected as the old factory grounds for Hoyland Fox, an umbrella frame manufacturer and was renamed Springfields.  The construction was placed on hiatus owing to the global financial crisis, but was finally completed in 2013.

See also
Listed buildings in Penistone

External links 

Avid Farm Shop
The Blacksmiths Arms
Millhouse Green Village Community Association
Millhouse Green Male Voice Choir
Millhouse Primary School

Geography of the Metropolitan Borough of Barnsley
Villages in South Yorkshire
Towns and villages of the Peak District